Burak Yamantürk (born 23 December 1983) is a Turkish actor.

Yamantürk was born on 23 December 1983 in İzmit. He first studied submarine technologies and received diving lessons, afterwards deciding to pursue a career in acting. He began studying at the Istanbul State Opera and Ballet and eventually graduated from Mimar Sinan University with a degree in modern dancing. He made his debut with a small role in the 2011 movie Ayhan Hanım, which was eventually released in 2014. In 2012, he made his television debut with the Veda TV series, in which he portrayed the character of Kemal. In 2015, he joined the cast of Acı Aşk. He also had a recurring role in the 2020 period drama Ya İstiklal Ya Ölüm.

Filmography

References

External links 
 
 

Living people
1980 births
Turkish male television actors
Turkish male film actors
Turkish male dancers
Mimar Sinan Fine Arts University alumni
Male actors from Izmit